This is a list of the rolling stock of the Welsh Highland Railway Limited which is used to operate the Welsh Highland Heritage Railway, a  narrow gauge heritage railway line in Porthmadog, North Wales.  The line opened in 1980.  The railway owns Russell - the only remaining original Welsh Highland locomotive, and a number of historically important coaches.

Locomotives

Steam locomotives

Diesel locomotives

Electric locomotives

Former locomotives

Coaches

All coaches are bogie vehicles unless otherwise stated.

Former coaches

References

External links
 WHR Ltd Stock

Welsh Highland Railway
Welsh Highland
Welsh Highland Railway Ltd